Half Girlfriend is the soundtrack to the 2017 Bollywood romance film of the same name, directed by Mohit Suri and starring Arjun Kapoor and Shraddha Kapoor in lead roles. The album was produced by Subhash Chandra and Ekta Kapoor under the banner of Zee Music Company and Balaji Motion Pictures.

The soundtrack is composed by Tanishk Bagchi ("Baarish"), Mithoon ("Phir Bhi Tumko Chaahunga"), Farhan Saeed ("Thodi Der" and "Stay a Little Longer"), Rahul Mishra ("Tu Hi Hai"), and Ami Mishra ("Lost Without You", "Manzoor Hai").

The song "Thodi Der" by Mithoon has the tune inspired from "The Riddle" by Nick Kershaw.

Critical reception
Half Girlfriends soundtrack generally received positive reviews from both critics and audiences, who especially praised the song, "Baarish" and all the versions of "Phir Bhi Tumko Chaahunga". Bollywood Hungama gave the soundtrack 4 out of 5 stars and wrote, "The music of Half Girlfriend is good and there is not a single wrong tune in there. A few songs at the beginning do have a sense of repetition but that could well be an endeavour to bring on a consistent sound. Though it would be unfair to compare every new soundtrack with that of Aashiqui 2 (as stated right at the beginning of this review), as a standalone soundtrack it is still better than most of the music that has been offered in 2017 so far."

Track listing

The film score is composed by Raju Singh, who has composed for all of Mohit Suri's previous films. The songs featured in the film are composed by Mithoon, Tanishk Bagchi, Rishi Rich, Farhan Saeed, Ami Mishra, and Rahul Mishra, while the lyrics are written by Manoj Muntashir, Arafat Mehmood, Tanishk Bagchi, Laado Suwalka, Anushka Shahaney, R. Rekhi, Veronica Mehta, Yash Anand, Yash Narvekar, and Ishita Moitra Udhwani.

The album, which includes 13 songs, was released on 28 April 2017 by Zee Music Company. Other songs were not included on the album but were released after the release of the film. The album includes a duet by Shreya Ghoshal and Farhan Saeed: "Thodi Der", which is the recreated version of Saeed's single of the same name.

Awards and nominations

Additionals

References

External links
 
 

2017 soundtrack albums
Hindi film soundtracks